Monsignor Donovan Catholic High School (MDCHS) is an independent, Roman Catholic high school located in Athens, Georgia, United States.

Mission
The mission of Monsignor Donovan Catholic High School as a Catholic college-preparatory school is to develop leaders with the competence, conscience, compassion, confidence, and courage who, out of love for Christ and others, will radiate Christ in their lives.

Academics
MDCHS offers a challenging academic program that serves as an excellent preparation for college. There are currently 9 AP classes offered: World History, United States History, English Language, English Literature, AB Calculus, Biology, Latin, Seminar and Research.

Athletics
MDCHS is a member of the Georgia Independent School Association (GISA).  School teams compete in football, softball, volleyball, cross country, soccer, basketball, swimming, tennis, baseball, track, and golf.  The MDCHS boys tennis team was the GISA Region 1AA champion in 2010.

See also

 National Catholic Educational Association

References

External links
 Monsignor Donovan Catholic High School website
 Logo

Catholic secondary schools in Georgia (U.S. state)
Educational institutions established in 2003
Schools in Clarke County, Georgia
Buildings and structures in Athens, Georgia
2003 establishments in Georgia (U.S. state)